What We Do Is Secret is a novel by Thorn Kief Hillsbery, published by Villard in 2005.

What We Do Is Secret takes place in Los Angeles in 1981, six months after the death of Darby Crash (lead singer of the Germs). It is narrated by a gay street kid named Rockets Redglare, who knew Darby personally. All the action occurs over the course of 24 hours, on Rockets' 13th birthday.

Synopsis
Rockets was ten years old when he first met Darby Crash, lead singer of LA punk band the Germs. He and Darby had a sexual relationship and Rockets, like many in the scene, looked up to Darby. Rockets was aware, however, that he was often manipulated by Darby's mind games and talent for controlling people. After Darby's death Rockets continues to hang out in the local punk scene, but things are changing and he considers leaving LA.

Rockets' circle of close friends is composed of Siouxie, Squid, and Blitzer. Peripheral characters include Rory Dolores, Animal Cracker, Slade, and Hellin Killer. Despite his age, Rockets is accepted as one of the gang, but he is secretly scared of being returned to a group home. Blitzer, a young man, is very affectionate towards Rockets and the two gradually become more intimate, sexually and otherwise. Blitzer holds out the hope of a new life for the two of them together in Idaho. Blitzer gradually gets more intimate with Rockets, buying a double sleeping bag when they go camping and offering to hold his penis in the bathroom. Eventually, after a concert, they make love and Rockets welcomes Blitzer's advances. They then shower together and Blitzer comments on the bruises that Rockets got when he was arrested by the police]. Rockets admits to Blitzer, "My worst fear is like ending up in a boy's home." Blitzer then gives the boy his first shave and later on shaves his head as Rockets turns from punk to skinhead for his birthday.

All four of the core group of friends make money by turning tricks of one sort or another and spend it on drugs, typically poppers, tabs, and the amphetamine derivative Desoxyn. Two gay tourists hire the group to show them around LA and are therefore also involved in much of the action of the book.

References

2005 American novels
American LGBT novels
Fiction set in 1981
Novels set in Los Angeles
Villard (imprint) books